Qualification for the boxing events at the 2020 Summer Olympics is determined by the performances at four Continental Olympic Qualifying Tournaments (Africa, Americas, Asia & Oceania, and Europe) and at the World Olympic Qualification Tournament, all of which were scheduled to take place on two separate phases because of the consequent Olympic delay and the circumstances involved in the COVID-19 crisis: January to March 2020 and April to June 2021. The event is set to return to London in 2021. The World Olympic Qualifying Tournament is currently in contention of being held. The current consensus is in its cancellation, but changes may occur. The 2020 European Boxing Olympic Qualification Tournament may yet again be postponed, this time to June, 2021. AIBA was suspended by the IOC as the Olympic governing body for boxing in 2019. However, AIBA has reiterated its offer to work with the IOC Boxing Task Force to ensure the Olympic qualifying events can still take place. Further negotiations continue. If the 2020 World Olympic Qualifying Tournament is canceled, fifty-three quota places that would have been available at the World Olympic Qualifier will now be assigned based on rankings instead, with the best-ranked boxer per region, per weight category receiving a Tokyo 2020 berth.

Timeline

Qualification summary

Men's events
Olympic qualification system per continent and by weight category. The final list of qualifiers was announced on July 15, 2021.

Flyweight (52 kg)

Featherweight (57 kg)

Lightweight (63 kg)

Welterweight (69 kg)

Middleweight (75 kg)

Light heavyweight (81 kg)

Heavyweight (91 kg)

Super heavyweight (+91 kg)

Women's events
Olympic qualification system per continent and by weight category. The final list of qualifiers was announced on July 15, 2021.

**Japan earned two quota places at the Asia/Oceania Olympic Qualifying Event, so the two Host Country quota places were reallocated to the World Ranking

Flyweight (51 kg)

Featherweight (57 kg)

Lightweight (60 kg)

Welterweight (69 kg)

Middleweight (75 kg)

Notes: Qualification System – EN (06 May 2021) -
4 quota places per category, 1 for each category per continent (in women's 51kg - 5 places).

Notes

References

 
Qualification